Brittanee Laverdure (born March 1, 1982) is a wrestler competing for Canada. She won a silver medal in the 55 kg freestyle at the 2014 Commonwealth Games in Glasgow., 2012 World 5th Place, 2010 World University Champion, 2008 World Bronze Medalist, 2007 World 5th Place. She was the regional winner of the Tom Longboat Award for the Yukon in 2005.

2006 University of Calgary Female Athlete of the Year
Brittanee spent her varsity career as a member of the University of Calgary Dinos she was a Canada West Champion in 2001,2002,2005,2006 and  University National Champion in 2001,2002,2005,2006

She is married to Fuat Seker. Together they have a child.

References

Living people
Wrestlers at the 2014 Commonwealth Games
Commonwealth Games silver medallists for Canada
Canadian female sport wrestlers
1982 births
World Wrestling Championships medalists
Commonwealth Games medallists in wrestling
First Nations sportspeople
21st-century Canadian women
Medallists at the 2014 Commonwealth Games